Alla Vasilenko (original name: Алла Василенко; born 12 June 1972) is a track and road cyclist from Kazakhstan. She represented her nation at the 1996 Summer Olympics on the road in the women's road race and on the track in the women's points race.

References

External links
 
 profile at sports-reference.com

Kazakhstani female cyclists
Cyclists at the 1996 Summer Olympics
Olympic cyclists of Kazakhstan
Living people
Place of birth missing (living people)
1972 births
Cyclists at the 1994 Asian Games
Asian Games competitors for Kazakhstan
Kazakhstani people of Russian descent
20th-century Kazakhstani women